SCHOTT AG Site Mitterteich (formerly SCHOTT-Rohrglas GmbH) in Mitterteich, Germany is one of the leading manufacturers of glass tubing. With more than 1000 employees, it is one of the largest employers in the  Tirschenreuth district as well as in the whole Northern Upper Palatine. The Mitterteich site is the largest location of the Business Segment Tubing of Schott AG. Other locations are in Mainz, Germany, Rio de Janeiro, Brazil, and Vadodara, India.

Company history
The history of glass production in Mitterteich dates back to 1883. In 1930 the glass factory in Mitterteich was affiliated to the Grünenplan factory of SCHOTT AG. In 1885 Otto Schott invented the chemically resistant borosilicate glass which was also produced in tubing form.

In 1911: a tubing glass was developed which was especially well suited for the production of ampoules. The glass was registered in 1911 under the trade name FIOLAX and is still today one of  SCHOTT AG most important products. After the Second World War, from 1947 to 1948 production of  FIOLAX glass tubing began in Mitterteich.

In 1961: SCHOTT decided to extend and modernize Mitterteich as the location for glass tubing production.

In 1969: representatives of what is now Schott Glaswerke and the Glaswerke Ruhr AG agreed upon the foundation of Schott-Ruhrglas GmbH. 
The administration and sales departments of Schott-Ruhrglas were transferred to Bayreuth in 1972 which at that time was the official seat of the company.

In 1990: the company was renamed SCHOTT-Rohrglas.

In 2001: a new administrative building was put into operation in Mitterteich and the locations Bayreuth and Mitterteich were merged in Mitterteich.

Products
The company produces glass tubing, rods and profiles from approx. sixty special glass types. The tubing is produced in outside diameters of 0.8 mm to 460 mm in lengths of 0.3 mm to 10 meters.
In addition to the classical product ranges, technical tubing (e.g. DURAN) and pharmaceutical tubing (e.g. FIOLAX), backlight glasses and tubing for solar heat (receiver tubes for solar power stations) as well as algae production in tubular photobioreactors are becoming increasingly important.
The glass tubing is processed for a variety of applications, for example in pharmaceutics, chemistry, lighting (e.g. halogen lamps, UV lamps), environmental technology or microelectronics.
With an annual capacity of 65.000 tons, SCHOTT-Rohrglas GmbH is the biggest location of the Business Segment Tubing in the SCHOTT Group.

External links
 SCHOTT AG Tubing

Manufacturing companies of Germany